Rågsved metro station is on the Green line of the Stockholm metro, located in Rågsved, Söderort. The station was inaugurated on 13 November 1959 as the southern terminus of a one-station extension from Högdalen. On 1 December 1960 the line was extended further to Hagsätra.

A southerly extension of the Blue line of the Stockholm metro is currently under construction and expected to be opened for the passengers in 2030. As part of this development, the Blue line will take over this station.

References

External links
Images of Rågsved station

Green line (Stockholm metro) stations
Railway stations opened in 1959